Gadzoox Networks, Inc. produced hardware and software for the entry-level storage area network market. In 2000, at the peak of the dot-com bubble, the company was valued at $2 billion; however, after filing bankruptcy in 2002, its assets were acquired by Broadcom in 2003 for $5.8 million.

History
The company was founded in 1996.

In March 2000, the company acquired SmartSAN for $23.5 million.

In June 2000, the company launched Axxess.

In July 2000, during the dot-com bubble, the company became a public company via an initial public offering. Shares were priced at $21 each but soared as high as $87 each on the first day of trading, giving the company a market capitalization of $1.97 billion.

In August 2000, Bill Sickler, the CEO of the company, and Christine E. Munson, the CFO of the company, resigned after announcing a financial restatement. 

In January 2002, the company raised $8.9 million in funding.

In August 2002, the company filed bankruptcy.

In March 2003, Broadcom acquired the assets of the company for $5.3 million.

References

1996 establishments in California
2003 disestablishments in California
2000 initial public offerings
2003 mergers and acquisitions
American companies established in 1996
American companies disestablished in 2003
Broadcom
Companies that filed for Chapter 11 bankruptcy in 2002
Computer companies established in 1996
Computer companies disestablished in 2003
Defunct computer companies of the United States
Dot-com bubble